The Forgery Act 1913 (3 & 4 Geo 5 c 27) was an Act of the Parliament of the United Kingdom.

This Act was repealed for England and Wales and Northern Ireland by section 30 of, and Part I of the Schedule to, the Forgery and Counterfeiting Act 1981.

It was repealed in the Republic of Ireland by section 3(1) of, and Schedule 1 to, the Criminal Justice (Theft and Fraud Offences) Act 2001.

Section 1 - Definition of forgery

This section provided a definition of forgery.

Section 2 - Forgery of certain documents with intent to defraud

As to the mode of trial of offences under section 2(2)(a) in England and Wales, see sections 16(1) and (3) of, and paragraph 13(a) of Schedule 2 to, and paragraph 15(a) of Schedule 3 to, the Criminal Law Act 1977.

Section 3 - Forgery of certain documents with intent to defraud or deceive

Section 4 - Forgery of other documents with intent to defraud or to deceive a misdemeanour

As to the mode of trial of offences under this section in England and Wales, see section 16(3) of, and paragraph 15(b) of Schedule 3 to, the Criminal Law Act 1977.

Section 5 - Forgery of seals and dies

Section 6 - Uttering

Section 7 - Demanding property on forged documents etc.

As to the mode of trial of offences under section 7(a) in England and Wales, see sections 16(1) and (3) of, and paragraph 13(b) of Schedule 2 to, and paragraph 15(c) of Schedule 3 to, the Criminal Law Act 1977.

Section 8 - Possession of forged documents, seals and dies

Section 9 - Making or having in possession paper or implements for forgery

Section 10 - Purchasing or having in possession certain paper before it has been duly stamped and issued

Section 11 - Accessories and abettors

Section 12 - Punishments

Section 13 - Jurisdiction of quarter sessions in England

Section 14 - Venue

Section 15 - Criminal possession

Section 16 - Search warrants

Section 17 - Form of indictment and proof of intent

Section 18 - Interpretation

Section 19 - Savings

Section 20 - Repeals

Section 21 - Extent

Section 22 - Short title and commencement

Schedule

Indictments for ss. 2 and 6

The following specimen counts were formerly contained in paragraph 18 of the Second Schedule to the Indictments Act 1915 before it was repealed.

See also
Forgery Act

References
Halsbury's Statutes,

External links
The Forgery Act 1913, as originally enacted from the National Archives.
List of repeals and amendments in the Republic of Ireland from the Irish Statute Book

United Kingdom Acts of Parliament 1913
Forgery